The Tehoko-class (テホコ) locomotives were a class of steam tender locomotives of the Chosen Government Railway (Sentetsu) with 4-6-0 wheel arrangement. The "Teho" name came from the American naming system for steam locomotives, under which locomotives with 4-6-0 wheel arrangement were called "Ten Wheeler".

After the Liberation of Korea, of the 178 surviving locomotives of all Teho classes - including six previously owned by private railway companies - 106 went to the Korean National Railroad in the South, and 72 to the Korean State Railway in the North.

Description
The first large class of 4-6-0 locomotives delivered to Sentetsu was the テホコ (Tehoko) class, which were express locomotives equipped with automatic injectors and other improvements, and which were much larger than the previous Teho classes. The first nine, originally numbered 271–279, were built by ALCo's Schenectady Works in 1917, followed by six copies, numbered 280–285, built in the same year by the South Manchuria Railway's Shahekou Works; Another twelve followed in 1918 from ALCO's Pittsburgh plant, numbered 295–306. In the 1938 general renumbering they became テホコ1 through テホコ36. The 27 locomotives on the roster at the time of the 1918 renumbering became 701–727 in that year; the last nine, delivered in 1918–19 from Shahekou, were numbered 728–736. In Sentetsu's general renumbering of 1938 the class was designated テホコ (Tehoko) class, and the locomotives were renumbered テホコ1 through テホコ38.

Postwar

Korean National Railroad 터우5 (Teou5) class
The exact dispersal of the Tehoko-class locomotives after the partition of Korea in 1945 and the division of Sentetsu assets in 1947 is uncertain, but at least seven went to the South, where the Korean National Railroad designated them 터우5 (Teou5) class  and used them until April 1955, when they were replaced by diesel locomotives.

The only surviving Teho type locomotive in South Korea is 터우5-700, on display on a plinth at the entrance of Korail's Human Resources Department. Sentetsu held a commemoration of the 10th anniversary of the re-establishment of the Railway Bureau in Yongsan in 1935, and built 터우5-700 for display there. It was built as a cutaway displaying the internal structure of the locomotive, and it was equipped with a motor to move the driving wheels, which in turn shows the operation of the locomotive's moving parts. After use as a display item it was moved to the Railway University in Yongsan, where it was used as an instructional tool for students, until subsequently being relocated once again to its current location for preservation as part of Korea's railway cultural heritage.

Korean State Railway 더우오 (Tŏuo) class
Most of the class went to the North after the partition, where they were designated 더우오 (Tŏuo) class by the Korean State Railway, but little is known of their service lives and subsequent fates.

Construction

References

Locomotives of Korea
Locomotives of South Korea
Locomotives of North Korea
Railway locomotives introduced in 1917
4-6-0 locomotives
ALCO locomotives
Shahekou Works locomotives